The Greenville Public School District (GPSD) or Greenville Public Schools (GPS) is a public school district based in Greenville, Mississippi (USA).

Adam Ganucheau and Kate Royals of Mississippi Today wrote in 2021 that the district was "one of the most under-resourced school districts" in the United States.

Schools
High school:
 Greenville High School
 It has/had two campuses: Greenville Campus and Weston Campus

Middle schools:
 Coleman Middle School
 TL Weston Middle School

Elementary schools:
 Matty Akin Elementary School
 As of a year before 2017 it was the largest elementary school in the community.
 Julia L. Armstrong Elementary School
 Boyd Elementary School
 Darling Achievement Center (formerly Darling Elementary School)
 Carrie Stern Elementary School
 Trigg Elementary School
 Lucy L. Webb Elementary School
 It includes the Lucy Webb Kindergarten Preparatory School, the district's first area that only houses kindergarten classes.
 Weddington Elementary School

Preschools:
 McBride Pre-K Academy

Magnet schools:
 Solomon Magnet School

Other campuses:
 Greenville Technical Center

Former schools:
Solomon Middle School
 Fulwiler Elementary School
 Manning Elementary School
 McBride Elementary School

Demographics

2006–07 school year
There were a total of 7,001 students enrolled in the Greenville Public School District during the 2006–2007 school year. The gender makeup of the district was 50% female and 50% male. The racial makeup of the district was 97.30% African American, 2.44% White, 0.14% Hispanic, and 0.11% Asian. 97.1% of the district's students were eligible to receive free lunch.

Previous school years

Accountability statistics

See also
List of school districts in Mississippi

References

External links
 
 Greenville Public School District (old website)
 Greenville Public Schools - Greenville, Mississippi - Public School District at EducationBug.org
 Greenville Public Schools at SchoolDigger.com

Greenville, Mississippi
Education in Washington County, Mississippi
School districts in Mississippi